"Brief and Beautiful" is the third single by Norwegian pop singer Maria Arredondo, released from her 4th album For a Moment. The single spent six weeks on the charts, peak at No.4.

Charts

References

2007 singles
Maria Arredondo songs
2007 songs